John Alexander Frances MacDougall (born April 20, 1947 in Port Hood, Nova Scotia) is a former Canadian politician. He represented the riding of Timiskaming in the House of Commons of Canada from 1982 to 1993, as a member of the Progressive Conservative Party.

He first entered Parliament in 1982, in a byelection following the death of the riding's prior MP, Bruce Lonsdale.

On April 23, 1993, MacDougall became the centre of controversy when he made comments in the House of Commons attacking Sunera Thobani, the new head of the National Action Committee on the Status of Women: 

Thobani, in fact, had just received her landed immigrant status, and MacDougall's comments were widely criticized as racist.

MacDougall did not run for reelection in the 1993 election.

References

External links
 

1947 births
Living people
Members of the House of Commons of Canada from Ontario
Progressive Conservative Party of Canada MPs